Nidufexor (LMB-763) is a drug which acts as a partial agonist of the farnesoid X receptor (FXR). It has reached Phase II clinical trials for the treatment of diabetic nephropathy and nonalcoholic steatohepatitis.

See also 
 GSK-4112
 SR9009
 SR9011

References 

Farnesoid X receptor agonists